Faith Ellen (formerly known as Faith E. Fich) is a professor of computer science at the University of Toronto who studies distributed data structures and the theory of distributed computing.

She earned her bachelor's degree and masters from the University of Waterloo in 1977 and 1978, respectively, and doctorate in 1982 from the University of California, Berkeley under the supervision of Richard Karp; her dissertation concerned lower bounds for cycle detection and parallel prefix sums. She joined the faculty of the University of Washington in 1983, and moved to Toronto in 1986. From 1997 to 2001, she was the vice chair of SIGACT, the leading international society for theory of computation. From 2006 to 2009, she was chair of the steering committee for PODC, a top international conference for theory of distributed computing. In 2014, she also co-authored the book, Impossibility Results for Distributed Computing.

She became a Fellow of the Association for Computing Machinery in 2014.

References

Year of birth missing (living people)
Living people
American computer scientists
Canadian computer scientists
Canadian women computer scientists
Theoretical computer scientists
Researchers in distributed computing
University of California, Berkeley alumni
Academic staff of the University of Toronto
University of Washington faculty
Fellows of the Association for Computing Machinery